The Barrett M95 is a bolt-action rifle chambered in .50 BMG (12.7×99mm), and manufactured by Barrett Firearms Company. It has been adopted by a number of militaries around the world.

Overview
The M95 is an improved version of the earlier Barrett M90. It is a bolt-action rifle in a bullpup design.  The major difference between the M95 and the M90 is that the pistol grip and trigger have been moved forward  for better magazine clearance.  Also, the bolt handle has been redesigned and bent down and to the rear, the barrel chamber has been plated in chrome, and there are also some minor changes to the trigger and firing pin.

XM107
In 1999, the M95 won a military competition to become the new XM107.  A small number were purchased by the U.S. Army for further testing, but ultimately, the M82 was chosen. The Barrett website also announces that M95 rifle is used for military and law enforcement applications in at least 15 other countries.

Users

 - Comandos Anfibios,  Gendarmería Nacional Sección de Fuerzas Especiales, Grupo Alacrán
 - Jagdkommando special group of the Austrian Army.

 - Used in limited number by special operations forces.
 - Indian Army.
 - 9th Parachute Assault Regiment "Col Moschin".
: Employed by Jordanian Special Operations Forces.
 - Employed by the Malaysian Army Grup Gerak Khas.
 - Adopted by the Philippine Marine Corps. Rifles were purchased in 1998.
 - Used by the Special Operations Troops Centre of the Portuguese Army.
 - Used by Serbian Gendarmerie and by Special Brigade of Serbian Army.
 - Spanish Army and Spanish Navy.
 - Royal Thai Navy SEALs.

See also
List of bullpup firearms
List of sniper rifles

References

External links
Barrett product page on the M95
Barrett M95 operator's manual
Modern Firearms - Barrett Models M90 & M95

.50 BMG sniper rifles
Barrett firearms
Bolt-action rifles of the United States
Bullpup rifles
Sniper rifles of the United States
Anti-materiel rifles
Military equipment introduced in the 1990s